Westby is a hamlet in the civil parish of Bitchfield and Bassingthorpe, in the South Kesteven district of Lincolnshire, England.

Westby is considered a shrunken medieval village  and at the time of Domesday Book of 1086 it consisted of eleven households.

References

External links

Hamlets in Lincolnshire
South Kesteven District